Goytacaz Futebol Clube, or Goytacaz as they are usually called, is a Brazilian football team from Campos dos Goytacazes in Rio de Janeiro, founded on August 20, 1912.

Home stadium is the Ary de Oliveira e Souza stadium, capacity 15,000. They play in blue shirts, white shorts and blue and white striped socks.

History
The club was founded on August 20, 1912, after a misunderstanding of a group of boys from Natação e Regatas Campista club. They felt depreciated because a request to use a boat to travel at Paraíba River was denied by the club. They then abandoned the practice of rowing and founded a football club at Otto Nogueira's house.

Achievements
Campeonato Fluminense: 5
1955, 1963, 1966, 1967, 1978

Campeonato Carioca Série A2: 2
1982, 2017

Campeonato Carioca Série B1: 1
2011

Taça Santos Dumont: 1
2017

Campeonato da Cidade de Campos (Campos City Championship): 20
1914, 1920, 1926, 1932, 1933, 1940, 1941, 1942, 1943, 1945, 1948, 1951, 1953, 1955, 1957, 1959, 1960, 1963, 1966, 1978

Stadium

Goytacaz plays its home matches at Ary de Oliveira e Souza stadium, usually known as Arizão, which has a maximum capacity of 15,000 people.

Mascot
The club's mascot is a Native American of the  Goytacazes tribe,  first inhabitants of the city, which are also the source of the club's name.

Rival
Goytacaz greatest rival is Americano. The derby is known as Goyta-cano.

References

External links
 Official website

 
Association football clubs established in 1912
Football clubs in Rio de Janeiro (state)
1912 establishments in Brazil